Old Sulehay Forest is a  biological Site of Special Scientific Interest east of King's Cliffe in Northamptonshire. It is part of the  Old Sulehay nature reserve, which is managed by the Wildlife Trust for Bedfordshire, Cambridgeshire and Northamptonshire.

This ancient forest has a number of different soil conditions and coppice types, and the ground flora is diverse. Abundant herbs include dog's mercury, bracken, bramble, ramsons, wood anemone and bluebells.

There is access by footpaths from Wansford Road.

References

Sites of Special Scientific Interest in Northamptonshire
Wildlife Trust for Bedfordshire, Cambridgeshire and Northamptonshire reserves